XHSJ-FM is a radio station in Saltillo, Coahuila. It is owned by Grupo RCG, which also owns other radio and television stations and cable systems in the area.

History
XESJ-AM received its concession on February 3, 1943. It was owned by Radio Saltillo, S.A. and broadcast on 1250 kHz. It operated with 1,000 watts during the day and 500 at night, with daytime operations being raised to 5,000 watts in the early 2000s.

XESJ moved to FM in 2012 as XHSJ-FM. The concessionaire changed from Radiocomunicación de Saltillo to Herciana Frecuencia in 2013.

References

Regional Mexican radio stations
Radio stations in Coahuila
Mass media in Saltillo